Dominic Carter is an American news reporter and political commentator for Verizon Fios/RNN News which airs in NY, NJ, DE, and CT.  He is also a blogger for The Huffington Post, and does Radio work for WABC.

Education 
Carter grew up in The Bronx, NY. After high school, he attended the State University of New York at Cortland where he received a BA in journalism. Later he attended graduate school at Syracuse University. He and his wife have two children.

Broadcasting career 
Though best known for his current work as a television news journalist, Carter began his broadcast career in 1988 as a radio reporter. He spent most of that year covering Jesse Jackson's ill-fated presidential campaign. Later, his work as a radio reporter brought him a measure of prominence when he interviewed Nelson Mandela during Mandela's trip to New York.

In 1992 Carter made the move to television as a reporter and anchor with the newly launched New York 1, a Time Warner station in New York. Continuing his penchant for celebrity interviews, Carter's position as host of the news and commentary show Inside City Hall gave him access to a wider array of interviewees, including Cardinal John Joseph O'Connor, former President Bill Clinton, South African President Nelson Mandela, Mexican President Vicente Fox, former Secretary of State Condoleezza Rice, Hillary Clinton, and Congressman Charles B. Rangel. In 2006 Carter made national news as the moderator of a series of statewide debates in New York State, which included Senator Hillary Clinton. During the course of those debates, Senator Clinton acknowledged for the first time that she was considering a candidacy for the presidency.

Carter's work has sent him abroad to Japan, Israel, Somalia, and the Persian Gulf. In addition, he has appeared as a guest on Fox News Channel, CNN and MSNBC. On December 21, 2008, he appeared as a member of a guest panel on CBS News' Face The Nation

In 2008 the Time Warner Station expanded its news coverage during the political conventions, sending Carter to both the Democratic and Republican conventions. At the same time, the station's coverage of those events was made available through Time Warner Cable to customers outside the city of New York.

As of 2023, Carter is heard weeknights from Midnight - 1 AM ET. The last segment of his program features talk show host, Frank Morano, who follows him nightly.

Books 
In 2007, Carter released No Momma's Boy (iUniverse, May 1, 2007), a memoir that documents Carter's troubled relationship with his mother, who had been clinically diagnosed with paranoid schizophrenia. Carter takes readers on his life journey, going from the public school system and the housing projects of NYC, to a successful career in journalism. Carter has traveled all over the country speaking about his life and book.

As of 2021, Carter is heard on WABC 770AM from 4:00-5:00PM on Sunday, and on weekday earliest mornings from midnight to 1:00 AM.

Personal life 
In 2009, Carter was convicted of a misdemeanor, attempted assault of his wife; but won his case on appeal. In a 3-0 decision, the appellate court ruled the case should have never gone to trial.

References

External links
 Official websites: 1 2 3 4
 Official book website
 Huffington Post for links to posts

Living people
Year of birth missing (living people)
Television anchors from New York City
HuffPost writers and columnists
State University of New York at Cortland alumni
Syracuse University alumni